Zhang Aokai (born 18 February 2000), original name Zhang OK, is a Chinese footballer who plays for China League Two side Jiangxi Dark Horse Junior, on loan from  Shijiazhuang Ever Bright.

Club career
Zhang Aokai joined Chinese Super League side Guangzhou Evergrande's youth academy from China League Two club Shaanxi Daqin in 2012. He was promoted to Guangzhou's first team squad by manager Luiz Felipe Scolari in July 2016. Zhang made his senior debut on 30 October 2016 in a 4–0 home win against Shandong Luneng, coming on for Zheng Zhi in the 85th minute and taking over the captaincy for the rest of the match, making him the first player born in the new millennium to make an appearance in any of the Chinese professional leagues.

Zhang was excluded from Guangzhou's first team squad for the 2017 season. He left the club and underwent a trial with La Liga side Espanyol in the summer of 2017. He signed a professional contract with Espanyol and joined Juvenil A team on 19 July 2018. On 26 September 2019 Espanyol confirmed, that Aokai had joined UA Horta on loan for the rest of the season.

Personal life
Zhang Aokai's original name was Zhang OK; however, his given name violated the Name Registration Ordinance of the People's Republic of China; and thus, he could not apply for an identification card. Zhang's father changed his given name to Aokai, which shares a similar pronunciation with OK.

Career statistics
.

Honours

Club 
Guangzhou Evergrande
Chinese Super League: 2016
Chinese FA Cup: 2016

References

External links
 

2000 births
Living people
People from Xianyang
Chinese footballers
Chinese expatriate footballers
Footballers from Shaanxi
Chinese Super League players
Tercera División players
Guangzhou F.C. players
RCD Espanyol B footballers
UA Horta players
Cangzhou Mighty Lions F.C. players
Association football midfielders
Chinese expatriate sportspeople in Spain
Expatriate footballers in Spain